Etta may refer to:

Places in the United States
Etta, Mississippi, an unincorporated community
Etta, Oklahoma, a census-designated place
Etta, South Dakota, a ghost town
Etta, Virginia, an unincorporated community

Other uses
Etta (name), a list of people and fictional characters with the given name, nickname or stage name
ETTA, an abbreviation for the English Table Tennis Association, now Table Tennis England